kill puppies for satan is an indie role-playing game first published in 2001.
In kill puppies for satan, characters kill puppies (and other pets and wild animals) to earn “evil points”, which are used for casting spells, engaging in rituals, and other evil acts. Players portray people who do evil things (like killing puppies) so that Satan will give them supernatural powers.

Style
The manual is flippant, full of profanity, and excludes the use of both capitalization and art. Character generation takes around two minutes and includes scores such as how many people hate the player's character. The manual suggests a way to start that avoids the storyteller having to come up with a creative way to force the players to cooperate.

Publication history
After Vincent Baker had recently left a job so that his wife Meguey Baker could keep working, he got out his anger on paper in the form of a role-playing game called kill puppies for satan (2001), the first game design he made available to the public. Baker described the game as a "scream of rage" against the state of roleplaying development at the time, and did not playtest it as he intended to make a political statement rather than create a playable game. Baker also wrote a supplement to kill puppies for satan called cockroach souffle (2002). As a result of encouragement from members of the website The Forge, Baker turned kill puppies for satan into a PDF and began selling it around December 2002, listing "lumpley" email addresses and URLs in the game; Baker had used the name Lumpley on various online systems and it soon became the name of his indie publishing company, making kill puppies for satan the first game for Lumpley Games. kill puppies for satan generated significant hate mail, much of which Baker reprinted and mocked on his website; this publicity helped the game, encouraging Baker to print copies of the game to sell at Gen Con Indy 2003.

It is no longer available in print or as an individual PDF, but is currently available as part of a collection of other Lumpley Games PDFs.

References

External links
the lumpley games library on Lumpley Games' website. 
"kill puppies for satan (an unfunny roleplaying game)", RPGnet Capsule Review by Jonathan Walton on 23/10/02.

Comedy role-playing games
Horror role-playing games
Indie role-playing games
Role-playing games introduced in 2001